Edward Chen Kwan-yiu, CBE, GBS, JP (born 14 January 1945, Hong Kong) was the President of Lingnan University of Hong Kong.

He is now an Honorary Professor and Distinguished Fellow of the Centre of Asian Studies at the University of Hong Kong (HKU). He is a non-executive director of Wharf Holdings. He graduated with a Bachelor of Economics degree at the HKU in 1967. He then pursue further studies overseas at Oxford University (Linacre College), where he earned his M.Phil and D.Phil degrees in economics. He returned to HKU to be an Assistant Lecturer and then Chair Professor from 1970 to 1995. He left HKU to take the role of the President of Lingnan University in 1995 until he retired in 2007.

He was a member of the Legislative Council of Hong Kong and the Executive Council of Hong Kong. He was a member of the Hong Kong Basic Law Consultative Committee and the chairman of the Hong Kong Consumer Council.

References

Living people
1945 births
Members of the Executive Council of Hong Kong
Alumni of the University of Hong Kong
Alumni of the University of Oxford
Academic staff of the University of Hong Kong
Academic staff of Lingnan University
Commanders of the Order of the British Empire
Recipients of the Gold Bauhinia Star
Place of birth missing (living people)
Progressive Hong Kong Society politicians
HK LegCo Members 1991–1995
Hong Kong Basic Law Consultative Committee members
Heads of universities in Hong Kong